Back to the Trap House is the fourth studio album by American rapper Gucci Mane. It was released on December 11, 2007.

Critical reception 
The album received mixed reviews from critics. Jordan Sargent of PopMatters gave the album a rating of 8 out of 10 and called it "genuinely fun" and "excellent".

In contrast, Andres Tardio of HipHopDX gave the album an extremely negative review, awarding it 1 out of 5 stars and stating that it "fails to provide much in terms of great music for new listeners". He also stated that Gucci "sleepwalks his way through the album, lacking a tremendous amount of lyrical inspiration and overall energy".

Track listing

Charts

Weekly charts

Year-end charts

References 

2007 albums
Gucci Mane albums
Albums produced by Hit-Boy
Albums produced by Polow da Don
Albums produced by Shawty Redd
Albums produced by Fatboi
Asylum Records albums
Atlantic Records albums